Nathan Templeton may refer to:

 Nathan Templeton (Commander in Chief), a character in the TV series Commander in Chief
 Nathan Templeton (journalist), Australian sports presenter and reporter